King Arthur, formerly known as the California Tree, was a giant sequoia located in Garfield Grove, near the town of Three Rivers in California. Its base of up to about 50 feet (15 m) rivaled the General Sherman, the largest giant sequoia, for total mass. It died in the Castle Fire of 2020.

The tree was once known as the California Tree, as shown in National Park Service promotional literature from 1917. The King Arthur was the ninth largest giant sequoia in the world.

Dimensions
As of 2012, before the Castle Fire, the dimensions of King Arthur were:

See also
 List of largest giant sequoias
 List of individual trees

References

External links
 http://www.nps.gov/archive/seki/bigtrees.htm
 http://www.nps.gov/archive/seki/alttree.htm
 http://mbreg.de/mkportal/modules/mediawiki/index.php/Welt_(Top_50)

Individual giant sequoia trees
Sequoia National Park
2020s individual tree deaths